Dipterina is a genus of moths belonging to the subfamily Tortricinae of the family Tortricidae.

Species
Dipterina imbriferana Meyrick, 1881

Species formerly placed within the genus
Epichorista crypsidora (Meyrick, 1909)

See also
List of Tortricidae genera

References

External links
tortricidae.com

Tortricidae genera
Taxa named by Edward Meyrick